The Stockholm Eagles is a basketball club in Stockholm, Sweden. The club was established in December 2007. In 2012 the club qualified for the Swedish men's top division. After the 2012-2013 season, the club was kicked out of the Swedish top division after failing to live up to the economic demands.

References

External links
official website 

2007 establishments in Sweden
Basketball teams established in 2007
Basketball teams in Sweden
Sport in Stockholm